L Seng Zi (also spelt L Saing Zi or L Sai Zi) is a Burmese singer of Kachin descent. Her aunt L Khun Yi, and her cousin L Lun Wa, are also popular singers.

Discography

Incomparable Gratitudes (အနှိုင်းမဲ့ကျေးဇူးတော်) (2017)
Obsessed (အစွဲအလန်းကြီးသူ) (2017)
Wai Khwal Ma Ya Par Lar (2017)
Moe Kaung Kin Kha Yee (2019)

References

External links
 

21st-century Burmese women singers
Living people
Burmese people of Kachin descent
Burmese pop singers
Year of birth missing (living people)